Tucayaca gracilis is a species of spur-throat toothpick grasshopper in the family Acrididae. It is found in South America.

References

External links

 

Acrididae